Big Arm State Park is a Montana state park that is a unit of Flathead Lake State Park near Big Arm, Montana. Big Arm State Park is located on the western shores of Flathead Lake, the largest natural freshwater lake in the western United States. The park's recreational activities include fishing, boating, RV and tent camping, and swimming.

References

External links
Big Arm State Park Montana Fish, Wildlife & Parks
Big Arm State Park Trail Map Montana Fish, Wildlife & Parks

State parks of Montana
Protected areas of Lake County, Montana
Protected areas established in 1966
1966 establishments in Montana